The Imperials Sing the Classics, also titled Sing the Classics, is a 1984 studio album by Christian music vocal group The Imperials. It is their final album on the DaySpring label as they switched to Word Records' Myrrh label for their next album Let the Wind Blow (1985). The Imperials Sing the Classics is the group's 30th studio album as they were celebrating their 20th year of music and ministry by singing four-part harmony, reminiscent of their early years. It is an album of covers singing classic contemporary Christian music songs from the 1970s and early 1980s with production by Neal Joseph and arranged and conducted by Don Hart. The album peaked at number 8 on the Billboard Top Inspirational Albums chart.

Track listing

Personnel 

The Imperials
 Paul Smith – lead, vocals
 Jim Murray – tenor, vocals
 David Will – baritone, vocals
 Armond Morales – bass, vocals

Musicians
 Mitch Humphries – keyboards 
 David Huntsinger – keyboards 
 Alan Moore – keyboards 
 John Darnall – guitars
 Greg Jennings – guitars
 Craig Nelson – bass 
 Mark Hammond – drums 
 Dennis Holt – drums 
 Farrell Morris – percussion 
 Cindy Reynolds – harp
 Don Hart – arrangements and conductor 
 Kathy Hart – music copyist 

Brass and Woodwinds
 Ann Richards, Denis Solee, Bobby Taylor and Roger Wisemeyer – woodwinds
 Robert Heuer and Tom McAninch – French horn
 Ernie Collins and Dennis Good – trombone 
 Jay Coble and John Harbaugh – trumpet 

The Kristin Wilkinson Strings
 John Catchings, Mark Feldman, William Fitzpatrick, Jim Grosjean, Victoria Haltom, Gary Lawrence, Ted Madsen, Bob Mason, Phyllis Mazza, Conni McCollister, Laura Molyneaux, Samuel Terranova and Kristin Wilkinson – string players

Production 
 Neal Joseph – producer 
 Scott Hendricks – orchestra engineer, mixdown engineer 
 Jim Baird – vocal engineer 
 Phil Dihel – assistant engineer
 Sallie Gross – assistant engineer 
 Danny Mundhenk – assistant engineer 
 Hank Williams – mastering at MasterMix (Nashville, Tennessee)
 Jim Osborn – design, illustration

Charts

References

1984 albums
The Imperials albums
Word Records albums